Zoogloea, also known as zoöglœa, is a genus of gram-negative, aerobic, rod-shaped bacteria from the family of Zoogloeaceae in the Rhodocyclales of the class  Betaproteobacteria.

References

Bacteria genera
Zoogloeaceae